Chamestan (also Romanized as Chamestān and Chomastan) is a city and capital of Chamestan District of Nur County, Mazandaran Province, Iran.  At the 2006 census, its population was 9,481, in 2,420 families.

References

Populated places in Nur County
Cities in Mazandaran Province